Salaad Gabeyre Kediye (1933 – 3 July 1972), also known as Salah Gaveire Kedie, was a Somali senior military official and a revolutionary who was executed by the Siad Barre regime.

Biography
Kediye was born in Harardhere, Somalia, at the time an Italian colony. A career army man, he received military training at the Frunze Military Academy in Moscow (Военная академия им М. В. Фрунзе), an elite Soviet institution reserved for the most qualified officers of the Warsaw Pact armies and their allies. He later rose to the rank of General in the Somali National Army (SNA).

On October 15, 1969, while paying a visit to the northern town of Las Anod, Somalia's then President Abdirashid Ali Shermarke was shot dead by one of his own bodyguards. His assassination was quickly followed by a military coup d'état on October 21, 1969 (the day after his funeral), in which the SNA seized power without encountering armed opposition — essentially a bloodless takeover. The putsch was spearheaded by Major General Mohamed Siad Barre, who at the time commanded the army.

Alongside Barre, the Supreme Revolutionary Council (SRC) that assumed power after President Sharmarke's assassination was claimed to be led by Gen. Kediye and Chief of Police Jama Korshel. Kediye officially held the title of "Father of the Revolution," and Barre shortly afterwards became the head of the SRC. The SRC subsequently renamed the country the Somali Democratic Republic, arrested members of the former civilian government, banned political parties, dissolved the parliament and the Supreme Court, and suspended the constitution.

A power struggle eventually ensued at the SRC's leadership. In 1971, Kediye and then Vice President Muhammad Ainache were charged with attempting to assassinate President Barre. Both men were shortly afterwards found guilty of treason, and along with Colonel Abdulkadir Dheel, were publicly executed the following year.

See also
Muhammad Ali Samatar
Abdullahi Yusuf Ahmed
Abdirizak Mohamud Abubakar
Muse Hassan Sheikh Sayid Abdulle
Mohamed Farrah Aidid
Ali Matan Hashi

Notes

References

External links
The 40th Anniversary of the Execution of General Salaad Gabeyre

1933 births
1972 deaths
Somalian military leaders
Executed military personnel
People executed by Somalia by firing squad
Executed Somalian people
Frunze Military Academy alumni